The 2010 North Carolina Tar Heels football team represented the University of North Carolina at Chapel Hill as a member of Coastal Division of the Atlantic Coast Conference (ACC) during the 2010 NCAA Division I FBS football season. Led by fourth-year head coach Butch Davis, the Tar Heels played their home games at Kenan Memorial Stadium in Chapel Hill, North Carolina. North Carolina finished the season 8–5 overall and 4–4 in ACC play to tie for third in the Coastal Division. They were invited to the Music City Bowl, where they defeated Tennessee, 30–27, in two overtimes.

NCAA investigations

On July 15, 2010, ESPN reported that players at the University of North Carolina were being investigated and interviewed by the NCAA for possible rules violations concerning sports agents and improper gifts. The next day, it was confirmed that certain members of the football team were thought to have received improper gifts from agents, which is not allowed by NCAA rules. Marvin Austin, one of the players suspected in the probe, had made numerous Twitter posts with questionable content, which the NCAA investigated, and he was the first UNC player to be indefinitely suspended, though for violation of team rules, and not the NCAA probe. Butch Davis, the head coach, did not say much about the probe, as he, and many others, expected a quick resolution to the investigation, and he was known for running a clean program. Soon after though, the NCAA began to look at defensive line coach John Blake, his relationship with certain agents, and whether or not he had received money from them. He later resigned. Also, former UNC lineman Kentwan Balmer admitted that he had paid for a trip to California for two current players. It soon became apparent that things would be much worse, and 13 players were suspended for the opening game. Furthermore, the university launched its own probe, and found academic misconduct within the football team.

Schedule

NFL Draft
Twelve Tar Heels were invited to the NFL Scouting Combine, more than any other team in the nation. Nineteen players participated in the annual university pro day, which attracted nearly 100 scouts and coaches from the National Football League (NFL). Many of the players participating, however, missed either part or all of the games played this season due to the above-mentioned investigation. With nine players selected in the 2011 NFL Draft, the Tar Heels were tied with USC for the most players selected.

* did not play in the 2010 season due to investigation

† missed part of the 2010 season due to investigation

References

North Carolina
North Carolina Tar Heels football seasons
Music City Bowl champion seasons
North Carolina Tar Heels football